Anna Kárász (born 20 September 1991) is a Hungarian sprint canoeist.  She won a gold medal at the 2020 Summer Olympics, in Women's K-4 500 metres.

Career
She participated at the 2018 ICF Canoe Sprint World Championships, winning a medal. At the 2019 ICF Canoe Sprint World Championships she and her partner Danuta Kozák were disqualified, since their boat weighed in light. She competed at the 2013, 2014,  2015, 2018, and 2021 Canoe Sprint World Cup.

Honors
She was named the 2014 Young Female Athlete of the Year by the Hungarian Olympic Committee.

References

External links

Living people
1991 births
Hungarian female canoeists
ICF Canoe Sprint World Championships medalists in kayak
Sportspeople from Dunaújváros
Canoeists at the 2015 European Games
Canoeists at the 2019 European Games
European Games medalists in canoeing
European Games gold medalists for Hungary
European Games silver medalists for Hungary
European Games bronze medalists for Hungary
Canoeists at the 2020 Summer Olympics
Medalists at the 2020 Summer Olympics
Olympic gold medalists for Hungary
Olympic medalists in canoeing
Olympic canoeists of Hungary
21st-century Hungarian women